Luc Charles Olivier Merenda (born 3 September 1943) is a French film actor.

He was one of the most prominent actors of the Italian poliziotteschi genre, working several times with Sergio Martino and Fernando Di Leo. He is of Italian origin through his paternal grandfather.

Partial filmography

 The Palace of Angels (1970) - Ricardo
 OSS 117 Takes a Vacation (1970) - Hubert Bonisseur de La Bath, alias OSS 117
 Law Breakers (1971) - Marco (uncredited)
 Le Mans (1971) - Claude Aurac
 Red Sun (1971) - Chato 
 Man Called Amen (1972) - Così Sia / Amen
 D'amore si muore (1972) - Enzo
 Torso (1973) - Roberto
 The Nun and the Devil (1973) - Carafo
 The Violent Professionals (1973) - Giorgio Martini - un giornalista pubblicitario
 Milano trema: la polizia vuole giustizia (1973) - Giorgio
 Oremus, Alleluia e Così Sia (1973) - Cosi' Sia / Amen
 Shoot First, Die Later (1974) - Domenico Malacarne
 Puzzle (1974) - Edward
 Gambling City (1975) - Luca Altieri
 La polizia accusa: il Servizio Segreto uccide|Silent Action (1975) - Inspector Giorgio Solmi
 Kidnap Syndicate (1975) - Mario Colella
 Nick the Sting (1976) - Nick Hezard
 Evil Thoughts (1976) - Jean-Luc Retrosi
 The Last Round (1976) - Rico Manzetti
 Destruction Force (1977) - Commissario Ghini
 A Man Called Magnum (1977) - Commissario Dario Mauri
 Could It Happen Here? (1977) - Ferruccio
 Hotel Fear (1977) - Rodolfo
 Tough to Kill (1978) - Keaton
 Deadly Chase (1978) - Commissario Verrazzano
 Target (1979) - Martin
 Action (1980) - Bruno Martel
 Love in First Class (1980) - Il poliziotto
 Il ficcanaso (1980) - Paolo
 Honey (1981) - El hombre de la habitación
  (1981) - Maniaco (uncredited)
 Pover'ammore (1982)
 Occhio nero, occhio biondo e occhio felino (1983)
 Superfantozzi (1986) - Various Characters
 Missione eroica - I pompieri 2 (1987) - McFarland
 'O Re (1988)
 Hostel: Part II (2007) - Italian Detective (final film role)

Television 
 The Black Adder (1983) as The Witchsmeller (French dub)
 Nonni and Manni (1988–1989)

References

External links

 

1943 births
Living people
People from Eure-et-Loir
French male film actors
French male television actors
French people of Italian descent